Elvis' Greatest Shit is a bootleg recording of Elvis Presley, released in July 1982. It assembles a number of studio recordings—including some film scores—and outtakes intended to represent the worst recordings Presley made in his career.

Contents 
The disc was assembled by a bootlegger known simply as "Richard", who thought some fans were overenthusiastic to the point of deification, and wanted to show that Presley, like most other artists, could not produce exclusively critically acclaimed work throughout his lengthy career. The tracks are mostly recordings from film soundtracks, along with a few outtakes of well-known songs; one is an aborted take of "Can't Help Falling in Love," in which, at the breakdown of the take, Presley exclaimed, "Aw, shiiiiiiiit!".

This "poor taste" concept did not merely extend to the album's contents but continued on the cover, which contained a photo of Presley shortly after his death, lying in a coffin. The photograph was allegedly taken by Presley's cousin and subsequently sold to the National Enquirer. The subtitle, "50,000,000 Elvis Fans Can Be Wrong", parodied the compilation album 50,000,000 Elvis Fans Can't Be Wrong, and the packaging included a reproduction of a prescription from George Nichopolous, who was one of Presley's doctors.

The album's putative record company was not RCA Victor, the record label for which Presley recorded for almost his entire career, but "Dog Vomit", while another copy had "RCA Victim" as its label, and both featured a parody of Nipper, the "His Master's Voice" RCA Victor dog trademark logo, vomiting into a gramophone, with the caption of "He Makes Me Sick" underneath him.

Most of these tracks are diegetic music from the following feature films:
1961: Blue Hawaii
1962: Girls! Girls! Girls!
1963: Fun in Acapulco
1964: Roustabout
1965: Girl Happy
1966: Double Trouble; Paradise Hawaiian Style
1967: Clambake; Easy Come, Easy Go
1968: Speedway; Stay Away, Joe
1969: The Trouble with Girls

Of the choice of tracks, Lee Cotten, author of several Presley books, said, "Elvis would probably have approved of the song selection. It is truly Elvis' greatest shit." One critic agrees that at least five of the songs are among Presley's worst. On the occasion of Presley's 75th birthday, another suggested that recording these songs should have made Presley self-destructive. 

Elvis himself was known to have negative opinions of at least two of the songs on the album. The first song was the nursery rhyme "Old MacDonald Had a Farm" for the movie Double Trouble. He walked off the sound stage when he learned he would have to sing such a childish song. The second song was "Dominic the Impotent Bull" from the movie Stay Away, Joe. At the end of the movie's recording session, Elvis made his record producer Felton Jarvis promise never to release the song anywhere apart from the movie. Jarvis kept his word and it was not on any record while either of the two were alive. This bootleg was released after both their deaths and was the first time that the song was on any record. As a result, the song's official title was unknown to Richard. An official release only happened in 1994 in the Kissin' Cousins/Clambake/Stay Away, Joe CD soundtrack compilation where the song's official title was revealed as "Dominick."

There have been four pressings of the album; the album covers vary in detail as do the disks—different color, design, and words, but the audio material is the same. One version has a white cover and the photo is relegated to the interior. The bootleg vinyl album has since been reissued as a CD. Whatever the format, "It is guaranteed that this CD probably gathers dust on collector's shelves instead of being played—the content  makes a strong statement of the 'situation songs' that Elvis had to perform."

Track listing

Side one 
 "Old MacDonald Had a Farm"
 "Ito Eats"
 "There's No Room to Rhumba in a Sports Car"
 "Confidence"
 "Yoga Is as Yoga Does"
 "Song of the Shrimp"
 "U.S. Male"
 "Fort Lauderdale Chamber of Commerce"
 "Signs of the Zodiac"
 "The Bullfighter Was a Lady"
 "Wolf Call"
 "Can't Help Falling in Love" (Outtake)

Side two 
 "He's Your Uncle, Not Your Dad"
 "Scratch My Back Then I'll Scratch Yours"
 "The Walls Have Ears"
 "Poison Ivy League"
 "Beach Boy Blues"
 "Dominic the Impotent Bull"
 "Queenie Wahine's Papaya"
 "Do the Clambake (Medley)"
 "Datin'"
 "Are You Lonesome Tonight? (Live)"
 "Well, Well, That's All Folks"

Other works 
This album does not fully encompass the 1974 talking-only album by Elvis, Having Fun with Elvis on Stage—it contains no music—which "is still widely considered to be the worst record ever officially released by a major artist."

"Richard" followed up Elvis' Greatest Shit with another bootleg featuring a black humoured theme—The Beatles vs. the Third Reich—containing a selection of recordings of the group's December 1962 appearance at the Star Club in Hamburg, and The Dark Side of the Moo—a compilation of rare or unreleased tracks by Pink Floyd, before exiting the bootleg industry.

Footnotes

References

External links 
 

1982 compilation albums
Elvis Presley compilation albums
Bootleg recordings
Compilation albums published posthumously